Dale Lennon (born December 13, 1960) is American former college football coach and athletics administrator. He served as the head football coach at the University of Mary in Bismarck, North Dakota from 1997 to 1998, the University of North Dakota from 1999 to 2007, and the Southern Illinois University Carbondale from 2007 to 2015, compiling a career record of 153–75. Lennon led the 2001 North Dakota Fighting Sioux football team to an NCAA Division II Football Championship. His record was 90–24 in nine seasons as the head coach of the North Dakota Fighting Sioux and he is the program's all-time winningest coach. In May 2017, Lennon returned to the University of Mary as the school's athletic director. He left University of Mary in 2022 to become the executive director of the State Historical Society Foundation of North Dakota.

Head coaching record

References

1960 births
Living people
American football running backs
Dickinson State Blue Hawks football coaches
Mary Marauders athletic directors
Mary Marauders football coaches
North Dakota Fighting Hawks football coaches
North Dakota Fighting Hawks football players
Northern State Wolves football coaches
Valley City State Vikings football coaches
Southern Illinois Salukis football coaches
People from Benson County, North Dakota
People from Rugby, North Dakota
Coaches of American football from North Dakota
Players of American football from North Dakota